The 2016 Qatar Cup, more widely known as the Crown Prince Cup is the twenty-second in the series, taking place from April 24 till the 29 April. The cup is contested by the top four finishers in 2015–16 Qatar Stars League.

2016 Participants
 Al-Rayyan : 2015–16 Qatar Stars League champions
 El Jaish : 2015–16 Qatar Stars League runners up
 Al-Sadd : 2015–16 Qatar Stars League third place
 Lekhwiya : 2015–16 Qatar Stars League 4th place

Bracket

Match details

Semi-finals

Final

References

Qatar Crown Prince Cup
Qatar Crown Prince Cup
Qatar Cup